Brown galaxias may refer to:

 Galaxias fuscus
 Galaxias olidus, also known as the South Australian minnow, or mountain galaxias